Aonghus Óg Mac Domhnaill (died 1314 × 1318/ 1330), or Angus Og MacDonald, was a fourteenth-century Scottish magnate and chief of Clann Domhnaill. He was a younger son of Aonghus Mór mac Domhnaill, Lord of Islay. After the latter's apparent death, the chiefship of the kindred was assumed by Aonghus Óg's elder brother, Alasdair Óg Mac Domhnaill.

Most of the documentation regarding Aonghus Óg's career concerns his support of Edward I, King of England against supporters of John, King of Scotland. The latter's principal adherents on the western seaboard of Scotland were Clann Dubhghaill, regional rivals of Clann Domhnaill. Although there is much uncertainty concerning the Clann Domhnaill chiefship at this period in history, at some point after Alasdair Óg's apparent death at the hands of Clann Dubhghaill in 1299, Aonghus Óg seems to have taken up the chiefship as Lord of Islay.

Pressure from Clann Domhnaill and other supporters of the English Crown evidently compelled Clann Dubhghaill into coming onside with the English in the first years of the fourteenth century. However, when Robert Bruce VII, Earl of Carrick murdered the Scottish claimant John Comyn of Badenoch in 1306, and subsequently made himself King of Scotland (as Robert I), Clann Domhnaill seems to have switched their allegiance to Robert I in an effort to gain leverage against Clann Dubhghaill. Members of Clann Domhnaill almost certainly harboured the latter in 1306, when he was doggedly pursued by adherents of the English Crown.

Following Robert I's successful consolidation of the Scottish kingship, Aonghus Óg and other members of his kindred were rewarded with extensive grants of territories formerly held by their regional opponents. According to the late fourteenth-century Bruce, Aonghus Óg participated in the Battle of Bannockburn in 1314, Robert I's greatest victory over the English. It is uncertain when Aonghus Óg died. It could have been before or after the death of an unknown member of the clan at the Battle of Faughart in 1318—a man who seems to have held the chiefship at the time. Certainly, Eóin Mac Domhnaill—Aonghus Óg's lawful son by Áine Ní Chatháin—held the chiefship by the 1330s, and became the first member of Clann Domhnaill to rule as Lord of the Isles.

Familial background

Aonghus Óg was a younger son of Aonghus Mór mac Domhnaill, Lord of Islay, chief of Clann Domhnaill. The latter last appears on record in 1293, when he was listed as one of the principal landholders in Argyll. At about this period, the territories possessed by the clan comprised Kintyre, Islay, southern Jura, and perhaps Colonsay and Oronsay. Clann Domhnaill was a branch of Clann Somhairle. Other branches included Clann Dubhghaill—the senior-most—and Clann Ruaidhrí. 

Aonghus Óg's mother was a member of the Caimbéalaigh kindred (the Campbells). According to Hebridean tradition preserved by the seventeenth-century Sleat History, she was a daughter of Cailéan Mór Caimbéal, a leading member of the Caimbéalaigh. Aonghus Óg had a sister who married Domhnall Óg Ó Domhnaill, King of Tír Chonaill; another sister who married Hugh Bisset; an older brother, Alasdair Óg, who appears to have succeeded their father by 1296; and another brother, Eóin Sprangach, ancestor of the Ardnamurchan branch of Clann Domhnaill.

In English service against King John Balliol

When Alexander III, King of Scotland died in 1286, his acknowledged heir was his granddaughter, Margaret. Although this Norwegian girl was accepted by the magnates of the realm, and betrothed to the heir of Edward I, King of England, she perished on her journey to Scotland, and her death triggered a succession crisis. 

The leading claimants to kingship were John Balliol, Lord of Galloway and Robert Bruce V, Lord of Annandale. By common consent, Edward I was invited to arbitrate the dispute. In 1292, John Balliol's claims were accepted, and he was duly inaugurated as King of Scotland. Unfortunately for this king, his ambitious English counterpart systematically undermined his royal authority, and John's reign lasted only about four years. In 1296, after John ratified a military treaty with France, and refused to hand over Scottish castles to Edward I's control, the English marched north and crushed the Scots at Dunbar. Edward I's forces proceeded forward virtually unopposed, whereupon Scotland fell under English control.

The chief of Clann Dubhghaill in the last quarter of the thirteenth century and first decade of the next was Alasdair Mac Dubhghaill, Lord of Argyll. The wife of this pre-eminent magnate—and mother of Eóin Mac Dubhghaill, his son and successor—was almost certainly a member of the Comyn kindred, a family closely bound to the Balliol family. 

During the short Balliol regime, Alasdair Mac Dubhghaill had been appointed Sheriff of Lorn, a position which made him the Scottish Crown's representative throughout much of the western seaboard, including Clann Domhnaill and Caimbéalaigh territories. If tradition preserved by the seventeenth-century Ane Accompt of the Genealogie of the Campbells is to be believed, Clann Dubhghaill overcame and slew Cailéan Mór in the 1290s. Certainly, Alasdair Mac Dubhghaill came into bloody conflict with his Clann Domhnaill counterpart during the decade.

This Clann Somhairle infighting appears to have stemmed from Alasdair Óg's marriage to an apparent member of Clann Dubhghaill, and seems to have concerned this woman's territorial claims. Although the opposing chiefs swore to postpone their disagreement in 1292, and uphold the peace in the "isles and outlying territories", the struggle continued throughout the 1290s. 

Clann Dubhghaill authority along the western seaboard was seriously threatened by about 1296, when Alasdair Óg was acting as Edward I's royal representative in the region. Certainly, Alasdair Óg appealed to the English king regarding Alasdair Mac Dubhghaill's ravaging of Clann Domhnaill territories in 1297, and may well be identical to the like-named Clann Domhnaill dynast who was recorded slain against Alasdair Mac Dubhghaill two years later. If this identification is indeed correct, this could have been the point when Aonghus Óg succeeded Alasdair Óg as chief.

Shift of allegiance to the Bruce cause

In February 1306, Robert the Bruce, a claimant to the Scottish throne, killed his chief rival to the kingship, John Comyn of Badenoch. Although Bruce was crowned King of Scots by March, the English Crown immediately struck back, defeating his forces in June. By September, Robert was a fugitive, and escaped into the Hebrides. There is no certain record of Aonghus Óg between 1301 and 1306. According to the highly reliable fourteenth-century poem The Brus, Aonghus Óg played an instrumental part in Robert's survival and was ever loyal to the Bruce. Specifically, this source relates that, after Robert was defeated at Methven and Dalrigh in the summer of 1306, the king fled into the mountains and made for the coast of Kintyre, where he was protected by Aonghus Óg himself at Dunaverty Castle. Although the Bruce maintains that Aonghus Óg harboured the king at Dunaverty Castle, contemporary evidence reveals that Robert I's men were already in possession of the fortress by March, having acquired it from a certain Malcolm le fitz l'Engleys. In fact, in the immediate aftermath of John Comyn's death, Robert secured control of several western fortresses (including that of Dunaverty), seemingly in an effort to keep a lane open for military assistance from Ireland or the Hebrides.

 Penman's speculation is at odds with sources that speak of the Turnberry Band in 1286 that bound the Macdonalds to the Bruces and the long-standing friendship of Angus Og and Robert Bruce, as a result of which Angus Og fought with Robert Bruce in many of his battles from 1306 to Bannockburn.

According to the Bruce, Robert I stayed at the castle for three days before fleeing to Rathlin Island. There is reason to suspect that this account instead masks an historical incident in which the king fled from Kintyre to a Clann Domhnaill castle on Islay—perhaps Dunyvaig Castle—the next northernmost island. If the account of Rathlin given by the Bruce actually refers to Islay, it is still uncertain if Aonghus Óg played any part in the king's salvation. In any case, contemporary sources reveal that Dunaverty Castle succumbed to an English-backed siege in September. Quite where Robert I fled after leaving Kinytre is uncertain. He could have spent time in the Hebrides, Ulster, or Orkney. Certainly, the fourteenth-century Gesta Annalia II states that the king was assisted by Cairistíona Nic Ruaidhrí—an heiress with Hebridean connections—and it is possible that the king indeed set sail for a Clann Ruaidhrí or Clann Domhnaill island. Moreover, Edward I himself thought that Robert I was hidden somewhere amongst the islands on the western seaboard.

The catalyst behind Clann Domhnaill's shift of allegiance from Edward I to Robert I likely lies in local Hebridean politics as well as Scottish patriotism and loyalty to Robert Bruce. Whilst Edward I's destruction of the Balliol regime in 1296 resulted in Clann Dubhghaill finding itself out of favour with the English regime, Clann Domhnaill seems to have sided with the English Crown in an effort to earn royal support in its localised power struggle with Clann Dubhghaill. To the leading clans on the western seaboard, internecine rivalries appear to have been more of a concern than the greater war over the Scottish Crown. Aonghus Óg's documented service to the English Crown in the years after Alasdair Óg's apparent death was almost certainly undertaken in the context of pursuing his kindred's struggle against Clann Dubhghaill. Pressure from Clann Domhnaill and other supporters of the English Crown evidently compelled Clann Dubhghaill into coming onside with the English in the first years of the fourteenth century. Whilst Robert I's subsequent murder of John Comyn undoubtedly galvanised Clann Dubhghaill's new-found alignment with Edward I, it also precipitated Clann Domhnaill's realignment of support from the English Crown to the Bruce cause. Although Edward I ordered Hugh and John Menteith to sweep the western seaboard with their fleets in 1307, the evanescent Scottish monarch remained at large, seemingly harboured by Clann Domhnaill and Clann Ruaidhrí.

Rewarded service to the Scottish Crown, and a contested chiefship

In 1307, at about the time of Edward I's death in July, Robert I mounted a remarkable return to power, first striking into Carrick in about February. By 1309, Robert I's opponents had been largely overcome, and he held his first parliament as king. Clann Domhnaill clearly benefited from their support of the Bruce cause. Although no royal charters associated with the kindred exist from this period, there are seventeenth-century charter indices that note several undated royal grants. For instance, Aonghus Óg was granted the former Comyn lordship of Lochaber and the adjacent regions of Ardnamurchan, Morvern, Duror, and Glencoe; whilst a certain Alasdair of the Isles received the former Clann Dubhghaill islands of Mull and Tiree.

Although the indices fail to note any Clann Domhnaill grants concerning Islay and Kintyre it is not inconceivable that the kindred received grants of these territories as well. Later in the fourteenth century, Aonghus Óg's son, Eóin Mac Domhnaill, was granted the territories of Ardnamurchan, Colonsay, Gigha, Glencoe, Jura, Kintyre, Knapdale, Lewis, Lochaber, Morvern, Mull, and Skye. It is possible that the basis for many of these grants laid in the clan's military support of the Bruce cause, and stemmed from concessions gained from the embattled king in about 1306. If this was indeed the case, the fact that Robert I later granted a significant portion of these territories (Lochaber, Kintyre, Skye, and lands in Argyll) to other magnates suggests that his conceivable concessions to Clann Domhnaill may have been undertaken with some reluctance.

There is reason to suspect that the Clann Domhnaill chiefship was contested during this period. For example, the royal grants to Aonghus Óg and Alasdair of the Isles—a man whose identity is uncertain — could be evidence that these two were competitors. Another apparent claimant to the chiefship, a certain Domhnall of Islay — whose identity is likewise uncertain—was present at the parliament of 1309. Furthermore, the Bruce states that when Robert I fled to Dunaverty Castle in 1306 he was fearful of treason during his stay. One possibility is that this statement preserves a record of the king's vulnerability to competing regional factions. Although the Bruce specifies that the Clann Domhnaill dynast to whom the king owed his salvation was Aonghus Óg, there is reason to question this claim. If Robert I indeed found protection at a Clann Domhnaill fortress—like Dunyvaig Castle—the attestations of Domhnall of Islay could indicate that it was he who assisted the king.

The Bruce was certainly influenced by later political realities, and was composed during the reign of Robert II, King of Scotland (reigned 1371–1390), the father-in-law of Eóin Mac Domhnaill. The fact that this son of Aonghus Óg ruled as chief when the poem was composed could account for the remarkably favourable light in which Aonghus Óg is portrayed. If the account of Rathlin Island given by the Bruce actually refers to Islay and Dunyvaig Castle, the description of the island's reluctant inhabitants being forced to assist the king could indicate that he did not trust the Clann Domhnaill lord. 

Furthermore, the claim that Aonghus Óg was Lord of Kintyre during this period could stem from the fact that, by the time the Bruce was composed, Eóin Mac Domhnaill was married to a daughter of the Robert II, and had gained this contested lordship by way of her tocher.{{#tag:ref|Earlier, during the tenure of Alasdair Óg, Clann Domhnaill appears to have vied for control of swathes of Kintyre with Malcolm.<ref>Duncan (2007) p. 144 n. 659–78; Barrow (2005) pp. 191–193, 437–438 n. 11, 460 n. 10; Dunbar; Duncan (1971) pp. 3–5, 16–17; Bain (1884) p. 225 § 853; [[#R2|Rotuli Scotiæ' (1814)]] pp. 22–23; Simpson; Galbraith (n.d.) p. 152 § 152; Document 3/0/0 (n.d.d).</ref> This man appears to be identical to the Lord of Kintyre who was slain in 1307 campaigning with two of Robert I's brothers in Galloway.|group=note}}

Seemingly in 1310, whilst in the service of the English Crown, Aonghus Óg inquired of Edward II, King of England as to whether Alasdair Mac Dubhghaill was within the king's peace, and entreated the king on behalf of several unnamed members of Clann Ruaidhrí—men were then aiding Aonghus Óg's English-aligned forces—to grant these Clann Ruaidhrí clansmen feu of their ancestral lands. An indication of the military might at Clann Dubhghaill's disposal may be Aonghus Óg's expressed opinion that, if he were able to join forces with Alasdair Mac Dubhghaill, Edward II would have nothing to fear from his enemies. The fact that Aonghus Óg styled himself "of Islay" in his letter could be evidence that he was indeed acting as chief at this point. Another letter—this one from Hugh to Edward II — reveals that Hugh, Eóin Mac Suibhne, and Aonghus Óg himself, were engaged in maritime operations on behalf of the English Crown, and were enquiring of the king about the status of Alasdair Mac Dubhghaill.

Participation in the Battle of Bannockburn

In the summer of 1313, Robert I's brother, Sir Edward Bruce, made an agreement with Sir Philip Mowbray, the English commander at Stirling Castle, that gave the English one year to relieve the English garrison or they would surrender the castle. In consequence of this agreement, Edward II announced a massive invasion of Scotland. On 23–24 June, the English and Scottish royal armies clashed near Stirling at what became known as the Battle of Bannockburn. Although there are numerous accounts of the battle, one of the most important sources is the Bruce, which specifies that the Scottish army was divided into several battalions. According to this source, the king's battalion was composed of men from Carrick, Argyll, Kintyre, the Hebrides (all of Angus Og Macdonald's Islesmen), and the Scottish Lowlands. Although the size of the opposing armies is uncertain, the Scottish force was undoubtedly smaller than that of English, and may well have numbered somewhere between five thousand and ten thousand. The battle resulted in one of the worst military defeats suffered by the English. Amongst the Hebridean contingent, the Bruce notes Aonghus Óg himself, who commanded the Islesmen and men of Argyll. According to this source, the king's battalion played a significant part in the conflict: for although it had hung back during the onset of hostilities, the battalion engaged the English at critical point in the fray. In any event, just as with the episode at Dunaverty, John Barbour's association of Aonghus Óg with Bannockburn could well be influenced by later political realities. However, John Barbour's account is recognised as highly accurate, and there is no evidence giving a reason to question the point and much to suggest Angus Og's support meant much, as witnessed by the many isles and lands a grateful King Robert bestowed on Angus Og.

Clann Domhnaill's part in the Bruce campaign in Ireland

Aonghus Óg—or at least a close relative—may have played a part in the Scottish Crown's later campaigning against the Anglo-Irish in Ireland. In 1315, Robert I's younger brother, Edward Bruce, Earl of Carrick, launched an invasion of Ireland and claimed the high-kingship of Ireland. For three years, the Scots and their Irish allies campaigned on the island against the Anglo-Irish and their allies. Although every other pitched-battle between the Scots and the Anglo-Irish resulted in a Scottish victory, the utter catastrophe at the Battle of Faughart cost Edward his life and brought an end to the Bruce regime in Ireland.

According to the sixteenth-century Annals of Loch Cé, a certain "" and a "" were slain in the onslaught. This source is mirrored by several other Irish annals including the fifteenth - to sixteenth-century Annals of Connacht, the seventeenth-century Annals of the Four Masters, the fifteenth- to sixteenth-century Annals of Ulster, and the seventeenth-century Annals of Clonmacnoise. The precise identities of these men are unknown for certain, although they could well have been the heads of Clann Ruaidhrí and Clann Domhnaill. Whilst the slain member of Clann Ruaidhrí seems to have been Ruaidhrí, the identity of the Clann Domhnaill dynast is much less certain. He could have been Alasdair Óg (if this man was not the one who had been killed in 1299), or perhaps a son of Alasdair Óg. Another possibility is that he was Aonghus Óg himself, or perhaps a son of his. An after-effect of the continued support of Clann Domhnaill and Clann Ruaidhrí to the Bruce cause was the destruction of their regional rivals like Clann Dubhghaill. In fact, the albeit exaggerated title "King of Argyll" accorded to the slain Clann Domhnaill dynast in many of these annal-entries exemplifies the catastrophic effect that the rise of the Bruce regime had on its opponents like Clann Dubhghaill. By the mid-part of the century, Clann Domhnaill, under the leadership of Aonghus Óg's succeeding son, was undoubtedly the most powerful branch of Clann Somhairle.

Death and descendants

Aonghus Óg died at some point after the Battle of Bannockburn—notwithstanding the Hebridean tradition preserved by the eighteenth-century Book of Clanranald and the Sleat History that dates his death to about 1300. Henry Lee, in his "History of the Clan Donald" states that Angus Og died at his castle in Finlaggan on Islay in 1330 and was buried at Iona. One possibility is that he died between 1314 and 1318. This could well have been the case if the slain Clann Domhnaill chieftain at Faughart was indeed his son and successor. After 1330, the Clann Domhnaill lordship seems to have taken up by his son, Eóin Mac Domhnaill.

The political situation in the Hebrides is murky between this man's accession and the disaster at Faughart, and it is possible that an after-effect of this defeat was a period of Clann Ruaidhrí dominance in the region. In 1325, a certain "", Ruaidhrí of Islay, suffered the forfeiture of his possessions by Robert I. Although this record could refer to a member of Clann Ruaidhrí—perhaps Raghnall Mac Ruaidhrí—another possibility is that the individual actually refers to a member of Clann Domhnaill—perhaps a son of either Alasdair Óg or Aonghus Óg.

If Ruaidhrí of Islay was indeed a member of Clann Domhnaill, and a son of Alasdair Óg, his expulsion may have marked the downfall of Alasdair Óg's descendants—Clann Alasdair—and may account for the fact that this branch of Clann Domhnaill failed to hold power in Hebrides after this date. As such, Ruaidhrí of Islay's expulsion could well mark the date upon which Clann Alasdair relocated overseas. The eclipse of Alasdair Óg's line—the senior branch of Clann Domhnaill—may explain the rise of Aonghus Óg's line. If Ruaidhrí of Islay indeed represented the line of Alasdair Óg, his forfeiture evidently paved the way for the rise of Eóin Mac Domhnaill. In fact, before the end of Robert I's reign, this son of Aonghus Óg appears to have administered Islay on behalf of the Scottish Crown, and eventually came to be the first Clann Domhnaill dynast to bear the title  ("Lord of the Isles").

If Aonghus Óg was still alive in 1325, he would have witnessed Robert I's apparent show of force into Argyll within the same year. Although Aonghus Óg's tenure as chief is remarkable in regard to his close support of the Bruce cause, the later career of Eóin Mac Domhnaill saw a conspicuous cooling of relations with the Bruce regime—a distancing which may well have contributed to the latter's adoption of the title "Lord of the Isles".

Aonghus Óg married Áine Ní Chatháin, an Irish woman from Ulster. According to the Sleat History, Áine Ní Chatháin's tocher consisted of one hundred and forty men from each surname that dwelt in the territory of her father, Cú Maighe na nGall Ó Catháin. The Book of Clanranald numbers the men at eighty. In any case, this tocher appears similar to an historical one dating almost a century earlier, when a Clann Ruaidhrí bride brought over one hundred and sixty warriors to her Irish husband. The tradition of the Clann Domhnaill–Uí Catháin union is corroborated by the record of an English safe-conduct instrument granted to Áine Ní Chatháin, identified as the mother of Eóin Mac Domhnaill in 1338. At a later date, Áine Ní Chatháin appears to have remarried a member of Clann Aodha Buidhe, a branch of the Ó Néill kindred.

Aonghus Óg and Áine Ní Chatháin were the parents of Eóin Mac Domhnaill. Another child of the couple may be the Áine Nic Domhnaill noted in the Clann Lachlainn pedigree preserved by the fifteenth-century manuscript National Library of Scotland Advocates' 72.1.1 (MS 1467). This source reveals that this woman was the wife of Lachlann Óg Mac Lachlainn, and mother of his son, Eóin Mac Lachlainn. Whatever the case, a certain daughter of Aonghus Óg was Máire, a woman who married William III, Earl of Ross. Aonghus Óg appears to have also had another son named Eóin, a man from whom descended the Glencoe branch of Clann Domhnaill.

Although the parentage of Alasdair of the Isles is uncertain, one possibility is that he was another son of Aonghus Óg. Domhnall of Islay could have also been his son.

According to the seventeenth-century Macintosh History, an ancestor of Clann Mhic an Tóisigh named Fearchar married a daughter of Aonghus Óg named "". As Fearchar died in 1274, it suggests this source has confused Aonghus Óg and Aonghus Mór. According to the Sleat History, an illegitimate daughter of Aonghus Mór was the mother of an early chiefly ancestor of Clann Mhic an Tóisigh. The father of this ancestor is stated to have fled to Aonghus Mór whilst on the run for committing manslaughter. Having fathered a son with Aonghus Mór's daughter, the man is stated to have campaigned with Edward Bruce in Ireland where he was slain. The Sleat History also claims that the slain man's son—the ancestor of later Clann Mhic an Tóisigh chiefs—was brought up in Clann Domhnaill territory and endowed by the kindred with lands in Lochaber and Moray. Alexander Mackintosh Shaw also confirms the father of Moran to be Aonghus Mór; "Ferquhard's intercourse with the fair Mora of Isla was at first of an unauthorised character, and that, this being discovered, the lover fled to avoid the wrath of the powerful father. He took refuge in Ireland, but before he had been there long he was recalled, and on his return made Mora his wife."''

Ancestry

Notes

Citations

References

Primary sources

Secondary sources

External links

13th-century Scottish people
14th-century Scottish people
Clan Donald
Medieval Gaels from Scotland
Scottish clan chiefs
Scottish people of the Wars of Scottish Independence
Year of birth unknown
Year of death unknown